Khandaqlu (also Romanized as Khandaqlū) is a village in Oryad Rural District, in the Central District of Mahneshan County, Zanjan Province, Iran. At the 2006 census, its population was 206, in 46 families.

References 

Populated places in Mahneshan County